Jari Kessler (born 29 November 1996) is a Croatian and Italian figure skater. For Croatia, he is the 2020 NRW Trophy champion, 2022 Jegvirag Cup silver medalist, and 2022 Merano Ice Trophy bronze medalist. He represented Italy until spring 2019, winning three senior international medals.

Personal life 
Kessler was born in Cles, Italy. He played pond hockey before switching to figure skating.

Career

For Italy 
Kessler originally competed for Italy. In the 2012–13 season, he moved up to the junior ranks. He made his senior international debut in January 2016, at the Mentor Toruń Cup in Poland.

Kessler's first senior medals came in the 2017–18 season. He won bronze at the Mentor Toruń Cup, in January, and another bronze at the Egna Spring Trophy, in April.

In October 2018, he took bronze at the Golden Bear of Zagreb in Croatia. The Egna Spring Trophy in March 2019 was his final competition for Italy.

2020–21 season: Debut for Croatia 
Kessler made his international debut for Croatia at the 2020 CS Budapest Trophy, where he placed seventh. In November 2020, he won gold at the NRW Trophy in Germany.

2021–22 season 
In January, Kessler competed at the 2022 European Championships in Tallinn, Estonia, but was eliminated after placing 31st in the short program. In February, he took bronze at the Merano Ice Trophy in Italy and silver at the Jegvirag Cup in Hungary.

2022–23 season 
Kessler qualified to the free skate at the 2023 European Championships in Espoo, Finland.

Programs

Competitive highlights 
CS: Challenger Series

For Croatia

For Italy

References

External links 
 
 

1996 births
Living people
Croatian male single skaters
Italian male single skaters
People from Cles